The Treaty on Political Asylum and Refuge is a multi-party treaty regarding political asylum and refugee law.  It was signed in Montevideo on 4 August 1939 and entered into force on 29 December 1954.

The treaty builds upon the Treaty on International Penal Law, adopted by the First South American Congress on Private International Law in Montevideo on 23 January 1889, incorporating doctrines already accepted due to situations which had occurred since between 1889 and 1939.

Member states
In order of appearance in the treaty preamble:
 Peru
 Argentina
 Uruguay
 Bolivia
 Paraguay
 Chile

References

Treaties concluded in 1939
1939 in Uruguay
Treaties entered into force in 1954
Treaties of Peru
Treaties of Argentina
Treaties of Uruguay
Treaties of Bolivia
Treaties of Paraguay
Treaties of Chile
Refugees
Human rights instruments

Right of asylum in South America